Yang Yu (born February 6, 1985, in Hangzhou, Zhejiang) is an Olympic medal-winning swimmer from the People's Republic of China. She became part of the Chinese national swimming team in 1999, and competed for Team China at the 2008 Summer Olympics.

Career

International debut and the 2000 Olympics

Yang competed in her big international meet in the 2000 World Short Course Championships in Athens, where she won the 200 freestyle in 1:56.06.  Later she qualified to swim at the Sydney Olympics, where she placed 17th in the 200 free (2:01.34).

2001, 02 and 03 World Aquatic Championships
Yang competed at the 2001 Fukuoka World Championships and won the silver medal in the Women's 200 m Freestyle event (1:58.78), after Australia's Giaan Rooney (1:58.57).   At the 2001 Chinese National Games, she placed 2nd in both the 100 (54.94) and 200 free (1:58.71).

In the 2002 World Short Course Championships in Moscow, Yang took gold in the 4x200 free relay (7:46.30, world record), silver in the 200 free (1:55.34, Asian record) and 200 fly (2:06.10), and bronze in the 4x100 free relay (3:36.18).  She won gold in the 200 free (1:58.43), 4x100 free relay (3:40.95), 4x200 free relay (7:58.46) and silver in the 100 free (55.51) at the 2002 Asian Games in Busan.

Yang started the 2003 season strongly by posting a world-leading 1:57.70 at the Chinese Nationals in April 2003, but at the 2003 World Championships (Barcelona), she only managed 3rd in this event (1:58.54).  She also took bronze in the 4x200 free relay (7:58.53.  Yang split 1:57.24, the fastest in history), and gold in the 4x100 medley relay (3:59.89, Asian record and 2nd fastest time in history.  Yang swam the freestyle leg and split 53.71).

2004 Olympic Games
Yang competed at the 2004 Summer Olympics in Athens. There she was a member of China's 4 × 200 m freestyle relay team, which won the silver medal in 7:55.97 (Asian record), beaten by the USA team who won in the world record of 7:53.42.  Yang was also part of China's 4 × 100 m women's freestyle relay team. China reached the final in this event but finished a disappointing 8th.

Yang competed as an individual in the 200m freestyle event, and qualified for the semi-final, but did not progress to the final.

2005-06
Yang did compete at the 2005 World Championships in Montreal, winning the bronze medal in the 200m freestyle event.  She posted strong times at the 2005 Chinese National Games, winning the 200 free in 1:57.86, 2nd fastest in the world globally.  At the 2006 World Short Course Championships in Shanghai, she took gold in the 200 free (1:54.94).  She failed to defend her 200 free title at the Asian Games in Doha, Qatar, beaten by teammate Pang Jiaying (1:59.26 to 2:00.73).

2007 World Aquatic Championships
Yang Yu took part in the 2007 World Aquatic Championships in Melbourne. She did not progress beyond the heat stage in the Women's 200 m freestyle, finishing 18th. She was also a member of the China's 4 × 200 m freestyle relay (which barely missed the final, placing 9th in the heats) and the 4 × 100 m freestyle relay which ranked seventh.

Notable Achievements
On January 18, 2004, she broke Susie O'Neill's world record in the women's short course 200 butterfly during a World Cup meet in Berlin, Germany, clocking a time of 2:04.04.

References

External links
 
 Chinese Olympic Committee page
 
 
 

1985 births
Living people
Chinese female butterfly swimmers
Swimmers from Zhejiang
World record setters in swimming
Olympic silver medalists for China
Olympic swimmers of China
Sportspeople from Hangzhou
Swimmers at the 2000 Summer Olympics
Swimmers at the 2004 Summer Olympics
Swimmers at the 2008 Summer Olympics
World record holders in swimming
Chinese female freestyle swimmers
World Aquatics Championships medalists in swimming
Medalists at the FINA World Swimming Championships (25 m)
Asian Games medalists in swimming
Swimmers at the 2002 Asian Games
Swimmers at the 2006 Asian Games
Medalists at the 2008 Summer Olympics
Medalists at the 2004 Summer Olympics
Olympic silver medalists in swimming
Asian Games gold medalists for China
Asian Games silver medalists for China
Medalists at the 2002 Asian Games
Medalists at the 2006 Asian Games
20th-century Chinese women
21st-century Chinese women